Beqasoor is a 1950 social drama film, directed by K. Amarnath, produced by M. R. Navalkar and starring Madhubala, Ajit and Durga Khote in lead roles. The film is a family drama and revolves around an inspector who is framed for doing black marketing and his wife who is forced to dance for money.

Beqasoor was theatrically released on 2 June 1950, and emerged as a box office success. The success of the film cemented Madhubala's position as one of the most bankable stars of those times, as well as having declared Ajit as a prominent newcomer.

Plot
Brij, a jobless young man is thrown out of the house with his blind mother by his nasty brother Ghanshayam and sister-in-law. To get a job, he travels to Bombay, and leaves  his mother at his sister's house.

In the train to Bombay, he encounters a mysterious girl, who introduces herself to be Usha Devi, a naive girl who ran away from her cruel brother's house to avoid forced prostitution. Meanwhile, Usha's purse is stolen by a passenger, and Brij offers to help her. He pays for her tickets as well as her hotel bill. Usha inevitably falls in love with Brij, and so does he.

Brij returns to Bombay with a job of policeman and Usha, now his wife. Unfortunately, he is soon framed for doing black marketing by his own jealous brother Ghanshyam and then jailed. On the other hand, Usha becomes pregnant. Now what will happen? The film answers the question.

Cast
 Ajit as Brij
 Madhubala as Usha
 Durga Khote as Brij's Mother
 Yakub as Ghanshyam
 Gope
 Pramila
 Mangla		
 Geeta Nizami		
 Ramesh

Production 
Trilok Kapoor was the initial choice for playing the male lead. However, he was replaced by Ajit later because of date issues. After Ajit was cast in the film, director K. Amarnath suggested him to change his long name "Hamid Ali Khan" and assume the screen name "Ajit". In Beqasoor, he was credited by the screen name for the first time.

Soundtrack 
Composed by Anil Biswas, the soundtrack of Beqasoor consisted of eight songs. The lyrics were written by Ehsan Rizvi and Aarzoo Lakhnavi.

Box office
Beqasoor grossed an estimated ₹0.9 crore at the box office, and resulted in a profit of ₹0.5 crore for the producers. It ranked seven in the list of highest-grossing films of 1950. Adjusted for inflation, the film's gross was equivalent to ₹125.3 crore in 2016.

References

External links
 

1950 films
1950s Hindi-language films
Films scored by Anil Biswas
Films directed by K. Amarnath
Indian drama films
1950 drama films
Indian black-and-white films